is a manga by Kiriko Nananan that was serialized in the alternative manga magazine COMIC Are!; the tankōbon was released on April 24, 1997. The English version, published by Fanfare/Ponent Mon, was released on March 15, 2006. Blue is about two high school aged girls, Kayako Kirishima and Masami Endo, who find that their friendship is turning into something more, and they are unsure about their future and feel confused about their current life.

Plot summary
Kayako Kirishima, who lives in Niigata, is almost ready to go off to college but is lonely and unsure of her future. Masami Endo is a girl who has been ostracized and made a social outcast for having an abortion.  The two girls meet each other in class one day and become good friends.  Gradually, Kirishima falls in love with Endo and the relationship becomes more personal.

In the middle of the book, summer vacation starts and Endo leaves to go off with the man who got her pregnant. During this time Kirishima misses her and can't wait for her to return.  When Endo does return, she lies about her experiences and says that she was traveling with old friends.  Kirishima knows she is lying and becomes upset with Endo souring the relationship.  Eventually the two forgive each other, but times have changed and Kirishima decides to go off to Tokyo and pursue a career in art while Endo chooses to stay in her hometown.  The manga ends with Kirishima riding off in a train to Tokyo as Endo looks longingly towards the train.

Notes
This work doesn't focus on expressionistic art and melodrama to tell its story; rather, in its place are minimalist, realistic imagery and storytelling.  In accordance to this style the layouts are muted and many sequences of panels only show subtle movement to highlight a particular emotion.

The manga was popular enough to spawn a live action film adaptation in 2001.  Additionally, Frédéric Boilet had it adapted to French as a part of his La nouvelle manga.  The current English edition by Fanfare/Ponent Mon is borrowed from the French publication.

References

External links
 Blue review at DVDVisionJapan.com
Shamoon, Deborah "Situating the Shōjo in Shōjo Manga : Teenage Girls, Romance Comics, and Contemporary Japanese Culture" Japanese Visual Culture Ed. Mark MacWilliams. ME Sharpe, 2007 

1996 manga
Manga adapted into films